Stadskanaal is a town and municipality with a population of 32,715 in the province of Groningen in the northeast of the Netherlands. It was named after the canal Stadskanaal.

From 1800 until 1900 this area was ideal for its peat mining, and so the canal came to ship all the peat to Groningen, the capital of the province.

In the Gronings dialect the town is called "Knoal" and the locals are called "Knoalsters".

Geography 

The population centres in the municipality are:

 Alteveer
 Barlage
 Blekslage
 Braamberg
 Ceresdorp
 Höchte
 Holte
 Horsten
 Kopstukken
 Mussel
 Musselkanaal
 Onstwedde
 Oomsberg
 Smeerling
 Stadskanaal
 Sterenborg
 Ter Maarsch
 Ter Wupping
 Veenhuizen
 Vledderhuizen
 Vledderveen
 Vosseberg
 Wessinghuizen

International relations 
Stadskanaal is twinned with 
  Bielsko-Biała in Poland

Gallery

Notable people 

 Cornelis Dopper (1870 in Stadskanaal – 1939) a Dutch composer, conductor and teacher
 Charles de Wolff (1932 in Mussel – 2011) a Dutch organist and conductor
 Henk Wijngaard (born 1946 in Stadskanaal) a Dutch country singer
 Henk Bleker (born 1953 in Onstwedde) a retired Dutch politician and jurist

Sport 
 Jannes Munneke (born 1949 in Musselkanaal) a retired Dutch rower, competed at the 1972 Summer Olympics
 Sylvia Smit (born 1986 in Stadskanaal) a Dutch female footballer

References

External links

 

 
Municipalities of Groningen (province)
Populated places in Groningen (province)